Songpa Sandae Noli is a type of sandae noli, Korean traditional mask play which has been handed down in the neighborhoods of Songpa-dong and Garak-dong in modern-day Seoul, South Korea. Sandae Noli is a mask dance that developed in Seoul and the mid of metropolitan region.

History 

Songpa Sandae Noli began with a cheerful parade called  georigut (거리굿) or gilnori (길놀이) as circling around the Songpa Market and nearby town in order to attract people to their performance. The two terms literally mean "street shamanistic ritual" and "street performanace" respectively. When parading, they wore masks and costumes, and played a type of marching music, gilgunak (길군악). With a decorative small flag used by farmers or yeonggi (영기, 令旗) at the head, the performers followed the musicians in procession. After the parade, they used an amulet to ward off misfortune and to wish everyone in the market to have good health and fortune.

Preparation 

The performers hold a seomakgosa (서막고사), a kind of jesa, sacrificial rite before the sandaenoli begins. Masks used for the coming performance are placed on a table setting for the jesa along with several varieties of food, and performers pour alcoholic beverages into a bowl and bow toward the table. This rite is to honor the dead and wish them to rest in peace, as well as to expect to have a good performance.

Story 

It consists of 12 acts called gwajang (과장, 科場) or madang (마당) in Korean. Songpa sandaenoli candidly depicts conflicts between classes and human nature.

Cultural significance 

Songpa Sandae Noli was designated as the 49th item on the list of Important Intangible Cultural Properties of Korea by the South Korean Cultural Heritage Administration in 1973.

Gallery

See also
Talchum
Namsadang nori
Important Intangible Cultural Properties of Korea

References

Further reading

External links
Information and video clip on Songpa Sandae Noli, Seoul Metropolitan Government
 Video with highlights from Songpa Sandae Noli, YouTube
[https://web.archive.org/web/20110614020336/http://www.ekoreajournal.net/archive/detail.jsp?BACKFLAG=Y&VOLUMENO=24&BOOKNUM=9&PAPERNUM=5&SEASON=Sep.&YEAR=1984  1984 publication by Cho, Ohkon with the script of Songpa Sandae Noli in English, Korea Journal

Korean dance
Important Intangible Cultural Properties of South Korea